Alastor schinzii is a species of wasp in the family Vespidae.

References

schinzii
Insects described in 1913